Gibraltar competed at the 2018 Commonwealth Games in the Gold Coast, Australia from April 4 to April 15, 2018. It was Gibraltar's 16th appearance at the Commonwealth Games.

Gibraltar's full team of 22 athletes (18 men and four women) was officially named on January 4, 2018. The team competed in seven sports.

Sport shooter Jonathan Patron was the island's flag bearer during the opening ceremony.

Competitors
The following is the list of number of competitors participating at the Games per sport/discipline.

Athletics

Gibraltar participated with 3 athletes (3 men).

Men
Track & road events

Cycling

Gibraltar participated with 3 athletes (3 men).

Road
Men

Gymnastics

Rhythmic
Gibraltar participated with 1 athlete (1 woman).

Individual Qualification

Shooting

Gibraltar participated with 6 athletes (4 men and 2 women).

Men

Women

Squash

Gibraltar participated with 1 athlete (1 man).

Individual

Swimming

Gibraltar participated with 5 athletes (4 men and 1 woman).

Men

Women

Triathlon

Gibraltar participated with 3 athletes (3 men).

Individual

References

Nations at the 2018 Commonwealth Games
Gibraltar at the Commonwealth Games
2018 in Gibraltarian sport